A metasyntactic variable is a specific word or set of words identified as a placeholder in computer science and specifically computer programming. These words are commonly found in source code and are intended to be modified or substituted before real-world usage. The words foo and bar are good examples as they are used in over 330 Internet Engineering Task Force Requests for Comments, the documents which define foundational internet technologies like HTTP (web), TCP/IP, and email protocols.

By mathematical analogy, a metasyntactic variable is a word that is a variable for other words, just as in algebra letters are used as variables for numbers.

Metasyntactic variables are used to name entities such as variables, functions, and commands whose exact identity is unimportant and serve only to demonstrate a concept, which is useful for teaching programming.

Common metasyntactic variables
Due to English being the foundation-language, or lingua franca, of most computer programming languages, these variables are commonly seen even in programs and examples of programs written for other spoken-language audiences.

The typical names may depend however on the subculture that has developed around a given programming language.

General usage
Metasyntactic variables used commonly across all programming languages include foobar, foo, bar, baz, and thud; several of these words are references to the game Colossal Cave Adventure.

A complete reference can be found in a MIT Press book titled The Hacker's Dictionary.

Japanese

French
In France, the word toto is widely used, with variants tata, titi, tutu as related placeholders. One commonly-raised source for the use of toto is a reference to the stock character used to tell jokes with Tête à Toto.

Usage examples

C

In the following example the function name foo and the variable name bar are both metasyntactic variables. Lines beginning with // are comments.
// The function named foo
int foo(void)
{
   // Declare the variable bar and set the value to 1
   int bar = 1;

   return bar;
}

C++

Function prototypes with examples of different argument passing mechanisms:
void Foo(Fruit bar);
void Foo(Fruit* bar);
void Foo(const Fruit& bar);

Example showing the function overloading capabilities of the C++ language
void Foo(int bar);
void Foo(int bar, int baz);
void Foo(int bar, int baz, int qux);

Python
Spam, ham, and eggs are the principal metasyntactic variables used in the Python programming language. This is a reference to the famous comedy sketch, "Spam", by Monty Python, the eponym of the language.
In the following example spam, ham, and eggs are metasyntactic variables and lines beginning with # are comments.
# Define a function named spam
def spam():

    # Define the variable ham
    ham = "Hello World!"

    # Define the variable eggs
    eggs = 1

    return

IETF Requests for Comments
Both the IETF RFCs and computer programming languages are rendered in plain text, making it necessary to distinguish metasyntactic variables by a naming convention, since it would not be obvious from context.

Here is an example from the official IETF document explaining the e-mail protocols (from RFC 772 - cited in RFC 3092):
  All is well; now the recipients can be specified.
 
      S: MRCP TO:<Foo@Y> <CRLF>
      R: 200 OK
 
      S: MRCP TO:<Raboof@Y> <CRLF>
      R: 553  No such user here
 
      S: MRCP TO:<bar@Y> <CRLF>
      R: 200 OK
 
      S: MRCP TO:<@Y,@X,fubar@Z> <CRLF>
      R: 200 OK
 
   Note that the failure of "Raboof" has no effect on the storage of
   mail for "Foo", "bar" or the mail to be forwarded to "fubar@Z"
   through host "X".

(The documentation for texinfo emphasizes the distinction between metavariables and mere variables used in a programming language being documented in some texinfo file as: "Use the @var command to indicate metasyntactic variables. A metasyntactic variable is something that stands for another piece of text. For example, you should use a metasyntactic variable in the documentation of a function to describe the arguments that are passed to that function. Do not use @var for the names of particular variables in programming languages. These are specific names from a program, so @code is correct for them.")

Another point reflected in the above example is the convention that a metavariable is to be uniformly substituted with the same instance in all its appearances in a given schema. This is in contrast with nonterminal symbols in formal grammars where the nonterminals on the right of a production can be substituted by different instances.

Example data

SQL
It is common to use the name ACME in example SQL Databases and as placeholder company-name for the purpose of teaching. The term 'ACME Database' is commonly used to mean a training or example-only set of database data used solely for training or testing. 
ACME is also commonly used in documentation which shows SQL usage examples, a common practice with in many educational texts as well as technical documentation from companies such as Microsoft and Oracle.

See also
Metavariable (logic)
xyzzy
Alice and Bob
John Doe
Fnord
Free variables and bound variables
Gadget
Lorem ipsum
Nonce word
Placeholder name
Widget
Smurf

References

External links
Definition of metasyntactic variable, with examples.
Examples of metasyntactic variables used in Commonwealth Hackish, such as wombat.
Variable "foo" and Other Programming Oddities

Placeholder names
Metalogic
Variable (computer science)
Syntax (logic)